Jim Hart  (pronounced ; born in the early 1950s) is a Canadian and Haida artist and a chief of the Haida Nation.

Biography
Hart was born in Masset, Haida Gwaii, British Columbia. His mother, Joan Hart, is the granddaughter of Charles Edenshaw. His father was European, allowing Hart to escape the Canadian Indian residential school system that many Haida of his time were sent to. Instead, he grew up with his grandparents and became a fisherman.

Hart discovered his passion for Haida art in high school. He began carving seriously in 1979. Hart first apprenticed with Robert Davidson in 1978 to help construct a set of totem poles. From 1980 to 1984 he became an assistant to Bill Reid in Vancouver, who by then was too seriously afflicted with Parkinson's disease to do much of his own carving. He began his work with Reid by putting the finishing details on The Raven and the First Man, a centerpiece of the Museum of Anthropology at UBC, and he also assisted on Reid's Spirit of Haida Gwaii / The Jade Canoe.

Hart lives in both Vancouver and Haida Gwaii. In Haida Gwaii, he is known as ˀIdansuu, a hereditary chief name that he received in 1999 after it had earlier been held by Charles Edenshaw. As chief he belongs to the Hereditary Chiefs Council of the Haida Nation.

Works
Hart was the first Northwest Coast artist to use bronze, beginning in 1982, and he has also made works in silver and gold. In 1988, he supervised the construction of the Haida house in the Canadian Museum of Civilization.

A 1995 wood sculpture that Hart considers to be his equivalent of a doctoral thesis, Frog Constellation, depicts two people on the back of a giant frog; it was installed in 2012 on the campus of Simon Fraser University. The Dance Screen, a large wood carving that he began designing in 2009, was installed in 2012 as a temporary exhibit in the Vancouver Art Gallery. Jim Hart's The Dance Screen (The Scream Too) was put on permanent display at the Audain Art Museum in Whistler and inaugurated in 2018. Another of Hart's works, a totem pole called the Respect to Bill Reid Pole, is part of the outdoor Haida village at the Museum of Anthropology at UBC.
A bronze sculpture by Hart, The Three Watchmen, is part of the collection of the National Gallery of Canada, and is installed outside the gallery in Ottawa.

Awards and honors
Hart was awarded the Order of British Columbia in 2003 and received a Queen's Diamond Jubilee Medal in 2013.

He holds an honorary doctorate from the Emily Carr University of Art and Design and was also awarded an honorary degree from Simon Fraser University in 2017.

References

External links
James Hart, Haida Carver, a one-hour documentary by PBS, originally aired June 18, 2009
Douglas Reynolds Gallery (Vancouver, British Columbia, Canada)

1952 births
Living people
20th-century First Nations sculptors
Canadian male sculptors
20th-century Canadian male artists
21st-century Canadian sculptors
21st-century Canadian male artists
21st-century First Nations people
Artists from British Columbia
First Nations jewelers
Haida woodcarvers
Members of the Order of British Columbia
Members of the Royal Canadian Academy of Arts